Cramér’s decomposition theorem for a normal distribution is a result of probability theory. It is well known that, given independent normally distributed random variables  ξ1, ξ2, their sum is normally distributed as well. It turns out that the converse is also true. The latter result, initially announced by Paul Lévy, has been proved by Harald Cramér. This became a starting point for a new subfield in probability theory, decomposition theory for random variables as sums of independent variables (also known as arithmetic of probabilistic distributions).

The precise statement of the theorem 
Let a random variable ξ be normally distributed and admits a decomposition as a sum ξ=ξ1+ξ2 of two  independent random variables. Then the summands ξ1 and ξ2 are normally distributed as well.

A proof of Cramér's decomposition theorem uses the theory of entire functions.

See also 
 Raikov's theorem: Similar result for Poisson distribution.

References

Probability theorems
Theorems in statistics
Characterization of probability distributions